Michèle Sabban is a French politician born 28 June 1954 in El Kef in Tunisia, especially committed to equality between men and women.

Political life 

Member of the French Socialist Party since 1981
Member of the National Council of the Socialist Party since 1983
Technical Adviser for the Promotion of Women from 1997 to 2002
National Secretary for Women's Rights in November 1997 to 2003
First Secretary of the Federation of the Socialist Party of Val-de-Marne from 1997 to 2008
Vice-President of the Regional Council of Île-de-France, in charge of General Administration and Personnel since 1998
Vice-President of the Socialist International Women North and South Mediterranean section since 2003
Member of the Congress of the Council of Europe since 2012
President of the Assembly of European Regions (elected in November 2008, re-elected in November 2010)
President of the R20 Regions of Climate Action (since January 2012).
President of FMDV-Global Fund for Cities Development since 2014

Personal life 

Michèle Sabban was born on 28 June 1954 in Kef, Tunisia to Jewish parents and emigrated to France as a teenager. She has three children from her late husband.

In May 2011 she received extensive media coverage for her defence of Dominique Strauss-Kahn.

References

Living people
Socialist Party (France) politicians
1954 births
21st-century French women politicians
French people of Tunisian descent